This is a list of all the United States Supreme Court cases from volume 449 of the United States Reports:

External links

1980 in United States case law
1981 in United States case law